Saint-Georges-sur-Erve is a commune in the Mayenne department, Pays de la Loire region in north-western France. The local people are known as 'Ervigeorgeais'.

It consists of a small sized village, home to a school, library and town hall, as well as a restaurant which serves as a tabac and newsagent to the village.

There is also a small mountain bike group, the Saint-Georges Adventure Group, which does yearly biking competitions starting at Saint-Georges to other areas.

Gallery

See also
Communes of the Mayenne department

References

Saintgeorgessurerve